Donald Cortez Anderson (born July 8, 1963) is a former American football cornerback in the National Football League for the Indianapolis Colts and Tampa Bay Buccaneers. He played college football at Purdue University.

Early years
Anderson attended Cody High School. He accepted a football scholarship from Purdue University, where he became a three-year starter. He tied the school record with 11 career interceptions.

Professional career
Anderson was selected by the Indianapolis Colts in the second round (32nd overall) of the 1985 NFL Draft. He was limited with injuries, appearing in five games as a backup cornerback, while making one interception and one forced fumble. He was released on August 26, 1986.

On March 30, 1987, he was signed as a free agent by the San Francisco 49ers. He was released on August 28.

On September 16, 1987, he was signed as a free agent by the Tampa Bay Buccaneers, to replace an injured Vito McKeever. He appeared in 11 games as a backup cornerback and recovered one fumble, during the strike shortened season. He was released before the start of the 1988 season.

References

External links
Don Anderson Stats

1963 births
Living people
Players of American football from Detroit
American football cornerbacks
Purdue Boilermakers football players
Indianapolis Colts players
Tampa Bay Buccaneers players